Queenpins is a 2021 American comedy film written and directed by Aron Gaudet and Gita Pullapilly. It stars Kristen Bell, Kirby Howell-Baptiste, Paul Walter Hauser, Bebe Rexha, and Vince Vaughn. Ben Stiller serves as an executive producer under his Red Hour Productions banner.

Released in the United States on September 10, 2021 by STXfilms, the film received mixed reviews from critics and was a box office bomb, grossing only $1.2 million against a $20 million production budget.

Plot
Dejected and frustrated suburban housewife Connie Kaminski (née Stevens), a three-time gold-medal-winning former Olympic racewalker, has followed the conventional life path set for her by society ever since she was young. Her sacrifices have never been appreciated and she has been overlooked by her husband Rick, an IRS senior audit specialist, her loved ones and the rest of society. Alienated by her uninspiring existence being unemployed and having suffered a miscarriage in an attempt to conceive a child, Connie commiserates with her best friend Joanna "JoJo" Johnson, who has been unable to secure proper employment since having her identity stolen and thus lives with her mother Josephine, attempting to generate revenue by making YouTube videos while being amorously pursued by the local mailman, Earl.

After a particularly frustrating day, Connie writes a complaint letter to General Mills about the Wheaties she ate being stale, and soon, she receives a coupon for a free box of cereal. Greg Garcia, a cashier at her local A&G Family Marts store, explains to her that companies habitually respond to complaint letters by sending coupons for free items. She and JoJo then learn that the coupons originate from an Advanced Solutions factory in Chihuahua, Mexico, deciding to travel there and collect the coupons to redistribute to other mothers and wives. They encounter married employees Alejandro and Rosa Diaz, who agree to send them the unused coupons. Afterwards, the duo begins their own website and small business "Savvy Super Saver", which helps them sell numerous coupons and generate profit. However, Ken Miller, a hapless loss prevention officer for the A&G Family Marts stores in the Southwestern United States, learns about the coupons and the losses several companies are taking, and pressures his superiors before ultimately deciding to handle the case himself.

The ladies’ account is frozen due to suspicious activity, so Connie realizes they need to prove their business is legitimate. They contact the hacker who stole JoJo’s identity, Tempe Tina, and are taken to her secret location, where she instructs the pair on how to conceal their operation and secure their money, suggesting they use JoJo’s cosmetics brand Back 2 Black to disguise their coupon business. After six months, the pair figure their money is safe to use, but because the money is dirty, they need to spend and clean it. They start buying things like sports cars, boats, planes, and guns, but Tina then criticizes their overspending and tells them that because their money was always clean, their purchases are just making them look more suspicious, instructing them to withdraw money from the bank in small increments and to sell off all their big purchases.

Meanwhile, Ken is partnered with U.S. postal inspector Simon Kilmurry. The duo bond on their mission, with Simon sympathizing with Ken's unwavering devotion. They interview people from grocery stores that the ladies frequent, almost all of whom recognize Connie due to her constantly irritating coupon usage, even successfully linking her to the "Savvy Super Saver" website as she uses its slogan while shopping. The duo then interview a group of postal workers, who remember JoJo, especially because Earl is always watching her videos.

After gathering sufficient evidence, Simon and Ken finally get agents to arrest the pair. While JoJo is released on bail, Rick visits Connie only so he can admonish her, having been informed by Simon that she and JoJo have defrauded over 240 companies of tens of millions of dollars. Having had enough of his lack of support, she declares that she wants a divorce. Though the pair face forty-years-to-life, the companies that they victimized clandestinely press the courts for leniency to avoid bad press, resulting in ten days imprisonment plus one year of probation for JoJo and eleven months incarceration (parole eligible in eight) for Connie. Though most of their fraudulent earnings have been confiscated, the pair have hundreds of thousands of dollars from their illegal activities stashed away, and JoJo starts a relationship with Earl and relocates to Montenegro, a non-extradition country, where the pair can immediately restart the scam upon Connie's release. It is also revealed that Connie, after numerous unsuccessful attempts to conceive following her miscarriage, is finally pregnant through in vitro fertilization.

Cast

In addition, the scenes involving the gun sale include short appearances by co-director Aron Gaudet's brother Nick as a barista, as well as actor and director Nick Cassavetes as the leader of the group buying the guns.

Production
In May 2019, it was announced Kristen Bell and Leslie Jones had joined the cast of the film, with Aron Gaudet and Gita Pullapilly directing from a screenplay they wrote. In July 2020, it was announced Paul Walter Hauser and Vince Vaughn had joined the cast of the film. In September 2020, Kirby Howell-Baptiste joined the cast of the film, replacing Jones, with Ben Stiller joining as an executive producer under his Red Hour Productions banner, with STX Entertainment set to distribute. In October 2020, Bebe Rexha joined the cast of the film. In December 2020, Dayo Okeniyi, Joel McHale, Nick Cassavetes, Michael Masini, Paul Rust, Eduardo Franco, Marc Evan Jackson, Lidia Porto, Greta Oglesby, Jack McBrayer and Annie Mumolo joined the cast of the film.

Principal photography began in October 2020, during the COVID-19 pandemic.

Release
In June 2021, Showtime and Paramount+ acquired U.S. pay TV and streaming rights to the film for about $20 million. It was released on September 10, 2021.

Reception

Box office
Other box office grosses include Russia ($326,012), Ukraine ($221,109),  
Netherlands ($200,244), United Arab Emirates ($123,281), Hungary ($88,609), Croatia ($41,810), Lithuania ($18,354), Iceland ($11,774), South Africa ($5,900) and Portugal ($5,501).

Critical reception
On the review aggregator website Rotten Tomatoes, the film holds an approval rating of 47% based on 62 reviews with an average rating of 5.40/10. The site's critics consensus reads: "Lowbrow humor and inconsistent storytelling undercut Queenpins talented cast, making this coupon-clipping comedy a disappointingly poor bargain." On Metacritic, the film has a weighted average score of 45 out of 100, based on 20 critics, indicating "mixed or average reviews". Hauser's performance as fraud specialist Ken Miller received praise from critics who praised his onscreen chemistry with Vaughn while noting that the film established him as a comedic actor after his breakthrough role in 2019's Richard Jewell.

References

External links
 
 

American crime comedy films
Films impacted by the COVID-19 pandemic
Films set in the Las Vegas Valley
Films set in Carson City, Nevada
Films set in Montenegro
Films set in Phoenix, Arizona
Films set in Salt Lake City
STX Entertainment films
2021 comedy films
2020s English-language films
2020s American films